Euploca is an almost cosmopolitan genus of plants with around 100 species. It was first described by Thomas Nuttall in 1837. While part of the broadly defined Boraginaceae in the APG IV system from 2016, a revision of the order Boraginales from the same year includes Euploca in the separate family Heliotropiaceae. Its species used to be classified in the genera Hilgeria and Schleidenia and in Heliotropium sect. Orthostachys, but were found to form an independent lineage in a molecular phylogenetic analysis, more closely related to Myriopus than to Heliotropium. While many species use the  photosynthetic pathway, there are also – intermediate species. Species have leaves with a -typical Kranz anatomy.

Selected species:
E. convolvulacea  (sweet-scented heliotrope, showy heliotrope)
E. filiformis 
E. fruticosa 
E. greggii 
E. humilis 
E. ovalifolia 
E. polyphylla 
E. procumbens 
E. pulvina 
E. salicoides 
E. strigosa 
E. tenella

References

Boraginaceae
Boraginaceae genera